Kevin Alons is an American politician. Before contesting the 2022 Iowa Senate election, Alons served in the Iowa Air National Guard.

Early life and career
Kevin Alons is one of four children born to Dwayne Alons and his wife. He was raised near Boyden, Iowa, and graduated from Boyden–Hull High School before attending Northwestern College. Alons had a 27-year career in the military, attaining the rank of colonel in the Iowa Air National Guard. He moved to Salix, where he became associated with the eponymous Alons Software as a software developer and consultant, and has also worked as an architect.

Political career
Alons served a single term as treasurer of the Republican Party branch in Woodbury County, and later became county party chair. He first led Woodbury County Republicans from November 2006 to 2009, was succeeded by Brian Rosener, and replaced Rosener in February 2015. Alons resigned the position in May 2018, and Suzan Stewart took on the role. On the advice of Jim Carlin, Alons began his campaign for District 7 of the Iowa Senate in December 2021. He won the November 2022 general election unopposed, replacing Democratic legislator Jackie Smith, who was redistricted.

References

Year of birth missing (living people)
Living people
21st-century American politicians
American company founders
People from Woodbury County, Iowa
Iowa National Guard personnel
Republican Party Iowa state senators
Architects from Iowa
Northwestern College (Iowa) alumni
United States Air Force colonels
Businesspeople from Iowa
21st-century American businesspeople
People from Boyden, Iowa